is an upcoming role-playing video game developed by Applibot and published by Square Enix for Android and iOS. It forms part of the Compilation of Final Fantasy VII, a series of media spin-offs from the 1997 video game Final Fantasy VII.

A single-player mobile experience, the game reimagines the timeline of Final Fantasy VII and the Compilation. It is scheduled for a worldwide release, beginning with a closed beta in summer 2023.

Content
Final Fantasy VII: Ever Crisis is a mobile game with loot boxes. Planned to be released in monthly episodic installments, the game retells events from the 1997 video game Final Fantasy VII, and all canon titles in the Compilation of Final Fantasy VII media franchise: the film Advent Children, and the video games Before Crisis, Crisis Core and Dirge of Cerberus. Chapters can be freely selected from a timeline, allowing players to jump between different entries in the series. The battle system draws from the original game's Active Time Battle system. The title will be free to play but will offer loot boxes that offer random selections of weapons and costumes.

Development
Ever Crisis forms part of the Compilation of Final Fantasy VII, a collection of media which expands the universe and narrative of Final Fantasy VII. Ever Crisis is being developed by Applibot and published by series creator Square Enix. It has Shoichi Ichikawa as producer, Kazushige Nojima as scenario writer, Yoshinori Kitase as executive producer and Tetsuya Nomura acting as creative director. The Compilation originally only included four official titles, concluding with Crisis Core in 2007. Beginning with the 2020-released remake, Kitase revived the Compilation and put multiple spin-off projects into production including Ever Crisis.

Nomura described Ever Crisis as an alternate remake of Final Fantasy VII. In addition to remaking the original storylines, original scenario writer Kazushige Nojima incorporated new material including the backstory of Final Fantasy VII: The First Soldier and stories from the childhoods of various FFVII game characters.

The graphics were described by Square Enix as a "nostalgic visual twist" on the super-deformed or "chibi" graphical style of Final Fantasy VII. Nomura originally wanted the character portraits to be 3D rendered moving portraits, but technical constraints forced the team to use 2D artwork. These portraits and other character artwork were created by Lisa Fujise. Voice acting is currently under consideration, with the mobile platform's technical limitations needing to be taken into account. Nomura also noted that the games vary widely in technology, style, and mechanics, and this title will allow the games to be presented in a unified package. The music will also feature new arrangements. It will mark the Western debut of Before Crisis, which was previously exclusive to Japan.

Ever Crisis was first hinted at in January 2021 with trademark registrations of the title in Japan, North America, Europe and Australia. The title followed naming conventions for the Compilation. The game was later unveiled in February alongside the PlayStation 5 version of Final Fantasy VII Remake, and the battle royale mobile spin-off title Final Fantasy VII: The First Soldier. It was planned for worldwide release, excluding mainland China, starting with a closed beta version in 2022, but was later delayed to summer 2023.

Notes

References

External links
 

Role-playing video games
Android (operating system) games
Ever Crisis
Final Fantasy video games
IOS games
Upcoming video games scheduled for 2023
Video game remakes
Video games developed in Japan
Video games directed by Tetsuya Nomura
Video games set on fictional planets
Free-to-play video games